Hugo is a 2011 American adventure drama film directed and produced by Martin Scorsese, and adapted for the screen by John Logan. Based on Brian Selznick's 2007 book The Invention of Hugo Cabret, it tells the story of a boy who lives alone in the Gare Montparnasse railway station in Paris in the 1930s, only to become embroiled in a mystery surrounding his late father's automaton and the pioneering filmmaker Georges Méliès.

Hugo is Scorsese's first film shot in 3D, about which the filmmaker remarked, "I found 3D to be really interesting, because the actors were more upfront emotionally. Their slightest move, their slightest intention is picked up much more precisely." The film was released in the United States on November 23, 2011.

Hugo received 11 Academy Award nominations (including Best Picture), more than any other film that year, winning five: Best Cinematography, Best Art Direction, Best Sound Mixing, Best Sound Editing, and Best Visual Effects. It was also nominated for eight BAFTAs, including a Best Director nomination (for Scorsese) and winning two, and was nominated for three Golden Globe awards, earning Scorsese his third Golden Globe Award for Best Director. Despite receiving acclaim from critics, the film was considered a box office disappointment, grossing just $185 million against its estimated $150 million budget.

Plot
In 1931 Paris, 12-year-old Hugo Cabret lives with his widowed father, a clockmaker who works at a museum. Hugo's father finds a broken automaton – a mechanical man created to write with a pen. He and Hugo try to repair it, documenting their work in a notebook. When his father dies in a fire, Hugo goes to live with his father's alcoholic brother, Uncle Claude, who maintains the clocks at Gare Montparnasse railway station. When Claude goes missing, Hugo continues maintaining the clocks, fearing that the Station Inspector named Gustave Dasté will send him away if Claude's absence is discovered. Hugo attempts to repair the automaton with stolen parts, believing it contains a message from his father, but the machine requires a heart-shaped key.

Hugo is caught stealing parts from a toy store, and the owner, Georges, takes his notebook, threatening to destroy it. Georges' goddaughter Isabelle suggests that Hugo confront Georges and demand it back. Georges proposes that Hugo work at his toy store as recompense, and after some time he might return the notebook. Hugo accepts and commences work, in addition to his job maintaining the clocks. Isabelle and Hugo become fast friends, and Hugo is astonished to see she wears a heart-shaped key, given to her by Georges. Hugo shows her the automaton, which they activate with the key. It draws a scene from the 1902 film A Trip to the Moon, once described to Hugo by his father. Isabelle identifies the drawing's signature as that of "Georges Méliès" – her godfather. She sneaks Hugo into her home, where they find a hidden cache of drawings, but they are discovered by Georges.

Several days later, at the Film Academy Library, Hugo and Isabelle find a book about the history of cinema that praises Méliès' contributions. They meet the book's author, René Tabard, a film expert who is surprised to hear Méliès is alive, as he disappeared after World War I along with the copies of his films. Excited at the chance to meet Méliès again, René agrees to meet Isabelle and Hugo at Georges' home to show his copy of A Trip to the Moon.

Finding the heart-shaped key on the station railway tracks, Hugo drops down to the track to retrieve it, and is run over by an out-of-control train that smashes through the station. He wakes up from the nightmare, but hears an ominous ticking emanating from himself, and discovers he has been turned into the automaton. Hugo wakes up again: it was only another nightmare.

At Georges’ home, his wife Jeanne allows them in after René recognises her as Jeanne d'Alcy, an actress in many of Méliès' films. They play the film, waking Georges, who is finally convinced to cherish his accomplishments rather than regret his lost dreams. Georges recounts that, as a stage magician, he was fascinated by motion pictures and used film to create imaginative works through his Star Film Company. Forced into bankruptcy after the war, he closed his studio and sold his films. He laments that even an automaton he built and donated to a museum was lost; Hugo realizes it is the one he has repaired.

Hugo races to the station to retrieve the automaton but is caught by Gustave, who has learned of Claude's death. Gustave threatens to take Hugo to the orphanage. Hugo runs away and manages to evade Gustave by hiding on the outer face of the clock tower, precariously balancing hundreds of feet above the ground. After climbing back down, Hugo races to escape the station but drops the automaton on the tracks. He jumps down to retrieve it and is almost run over by a train, but Gustave saves him and the automaton. Georges arrives and tells Gustave, "This boy belongs to me."

Sometime later, Georges is named a professor at the Film Academy, and is paid tribute through a showcase of his films recovered by René. Hugo and his new family celebrate at the apartment, and Isabelle begins to write down Hugo's own story.

Cast

Michael Pitt, Martin Scorsese, and Brian Selznick have cameo roles.

Production

Pre-production
GK Films acquired the screen rights to The Invention of Hugo Cabret shortly after the book was published in 2007. Initially, Chris Wedge was signed in to direct the adaptation and John Logan was contracted to write the screenplay. The film was initially titled Hugo Cabret. Several actors were hired, including Ben Kingsley, Sacha Baron Cohen, Asa Butterfield, Chloë Grace Moretz, and Helen McCrory. Jude Law, Ray Winstone, Christopher Lee, Frances de la Tour, and Richard Griffiths later joined the project. Hugo was originally budgeted at $100 million, but ran over with a final budget between $156 million and $170 million. In February 2012, Graham King summed up his experience of producing Hugo: "Let's just say that it hasn't been an easy few months for me—there's been a lot of Ambien involved".

Filming
Principal photography began in London on June 29, 2010; the first shooting location was at the Shepperton Studios. The Nene Valley Railway near Peterborough also lent their original Compagnie Internationale des Wagons-Lits rolling stock to the studio.

In August 2010, production moved to Paris for two weeks. Locations included the Sainte-Geneviève Library, the Sorbonne (where a lecture hall was converted into a 1930s cinema hall) in the 5th arrondissement, and the Théâtre de l'Athénée and its surrounding area in the 9th. High school Lycée Louis-le-Grand served as the film's base of operations in Paris; its cafeteria served 700 meals a day for the cast and crew.

Music
The film's soundtrack includes an Oscar-nominated original score composed by Howard Shore, and also makes prominent use of the Danse macabre by Camille Saint-Saëns and Gnossienne No. 1 by Erik Satie. Additional music was provided uncredited by French pianist and composer Jean-Michel Bernard. The singer Zaz performs on track 20, "Cœur volant".

Release
The film premiered at the NYFF on October 10, 2011, was theatrically released on November 23, 2011, by Paramount Pictures, and was released on DVD and Blu-ray on February 28, 2012, by Paramount Home Entertainment. Hugo was also the final film to feature the 2002–2011 Paramount Pictures logo, as the studio adopted a new opening logo for its 100th anniversary beginning the next month on December 7, 2011. Hugo has grossed $34.3 million in home video revenue.

The film had its UK premiere at the Royal Film Performance, an event held in aid of the Film & TV Charity, on November 28, 2011, at the ODEON Leicester Square. It was attended by the Prince of Wales and The Duchess of Cornwall.

The film debuted on the streaming service Paramount+ on January 5, 2022, and then debuted on HBO Max on April 1, 2022.

Historical references

The backstory and primary features of Georges Méliès' life as depicted in the film are largely accurate: He became interested in film after seeing a demonstration of the Lumière brothers' camera; he was a magician and toymaker; he experimented with automata; he owned a theatre (Théâtre Robert-Houdin); he was forced into bankruptcy; his film stock was reportedly melted down for its celluloid; he became a toy salesman at the Montparnasse station, and he was eventually awarded the Légion d'honneur medal after a period of terrible neglect. Many of the early silent films shown in the movie are Méliès' actual works, such as Le voyage dans la lune (1902). However, the film does not mention Méliès' two children, his brother Gaston (who worked with Méliès during his film-making career), or his first wife Eugénie, who was married to Méliès during the time he made films (and who died in 1913). The film shows Méliès married to Jeanne d'Alcy during their filmmaking period, when in reality they did not marry until 1925.

The automaton's design was inspired by the Maillardet's automaton made by the Swiss watchmaker Henri Maillardet, which Selznick had seen in the Franklin Institute, Philadelphia, as well as the Jaquet-Droz automaton "the writer". A portion of the scene with Harold Lloyd in Safety Last! (1923), hanging from the clock, is shown when the main characters sneak into a movie theater. Later, Hugo, like Lloyd in Safety Last!, hangs from the hands of a large clock on a clock tower to escape from a pursuer.

Several viewings of the 1895 film L'Arrivée d'un train en gare de La Ciotat are portrayed, depicting the shocked reaction of the audience—although this view is in doubt.

Emil Lager, Ben Addis, and Robert Gill make cameo appearances as the father of Gypsy jazz guitar, Django Reinhardt, the Spanish surrealist painter, Salvador Dalí, and the Irish writer James Joyce, respectively. The names of all three characters appear towards the end of the film's cast credit list.

The book that Monsieur Labisse gives Hugo as a gift, Robin Hood le proscrit (Robin Hood the outlaw), was written by Alexandre Dumas in 1864 as a French translation of an 1838 work by Pierce Egan the Younger in England. The book is symbolic, as Hugo must avoid the "righteous" law enforcement (Inspector Gustave) to live in the station and later to restore the automaton both to a functioning status and to its rightful owner. The particular copy given to Hugo looks like the 1917 English-language edition (David McKay publisher, Philadelphia, United States) with cover and interior illustrations by N.C. Wyeth, but with "Le Proscrit" added to the cover by the prop department. The film also depicts the Montparnasse derailment, when at 4:00 pm on 22 October 1895, the Granville–Paris Express overran the buffer stop at its Gare Montparnasse terminus.

In their confrontation with the Station Inspector, Isabelle claims she named her cat after the famous poet Christina Rossetti, as Isabelle then begins to recite the first lines of Rossetti's poem "A Birthday". Near the end of the film, Georges is in a discussion about the origins of filmmaking, and he and Jeanne mention the "cave pictographs in Niaux". This is a reference to the Cave of Niaux archeological site, which feature ancient wall paintings that are thought to be made 17,000 to 11,000 years ago.

Reception

Box office performance
Hugo earned $15.4 million over its Thanksgiving weekend debut. It went on to earn US$73,864,507 domestically and $111,905,653 overseas, for a worldwide gross of $185,770,160. Despite praise from critics, Hugo was cited as one of the year's notable box-office flops. Its perceived failure was due to competition with Disney's The Muppets and Summit's Breaking Dawn Part 1. The film was estimated to have had a net loss of $100 million. Producer Graham King said that the film's box-office results were painful. "There's no finger-pointing—I'm the producer and I take the responsibility," he said. "Budget-wise, there just wasn't enough prep time and no one really realized how complicated doing a 3D film was going to be. I went through three line-producers because no one knew exactly what was going on. Do I still think it's a masterpiece that will be talked about in 20 years? Yes. But once the schedule started getting out of whack, things just spiraled and spiraled and that's when the avalanche began."

Critical reception
On review aggregator Rotten Tomatoes the film holds an approval rating of 93% based on 230 reviews, with an average rating of 8.30/10. The website's critical consensus reads, "Hugo is an extravagant, elegant fantasy with an innocence lacking in many modern kids' movies, and one that emanates an unabashed love for the magic of cinema." Metacritic assigned the film a weighted average score of 83 out of 100, based on 41 critics, indicating "universal acclaim". Audiences polled by CinemaScore gave the film an average grade of "B+" on an A+ to F scale.

Roger Ebert of the Chicago Sun-Times gave the film four out of four stars, saying that the film "is unlike any other film Martin Scorsese has ever made, and yet possibly the closest to his heart: a big-budget, family epic in 3-D, and in some ways, a mirror of his own life. We feel a great artist has been given command of the tools and resources he needs to make a movie about—movies." Peter Rainer of The Christian Science Monitor gave it a "B+" grade and termed it as "an odd mixture: a deeply personal impersonal movie" and concluded that "Hugo is a mixed bag but one well worth rummaging through." Christy Lemire said that the film had an "abundant love of the power of film; being a hardcore cinephile (like Scorsese) might add a layer of enjoyment, but it certainly isn't a prerequisite for walking in the door" besides being "slightly repetitive and overlong". Michael Phillips of the Chicago Tribune give it three stars and described it as "rich and stimulating even when it wanders," explaining "every locale in Scorsese's vision of 1931 Paris looks and feels like another planet. The filmmaker embraces storybook artifice as wholeheartedly as he relays the tale's lessons in the importance of film preservation." Joe Morgenstern of The Wall Street Journal said that Hugo "visually ... is a marvel, but dramatically it's a clockwork lemon".

Hugo was selected for the Royal Film Performance 2011 with a screening at the Odeon, Leicester Square, in London on 28 November 2011 in the presence of the Prince of Wales and the Duchess of Cornwall in support of the Cinema and Television Benevolent Fund. Richard Corliss of Time named it one of the Top 10 Best Movies of 2011, saying that "Scorsese's love poem, rendered gorgeously in 3-D, restores both the reputation of an early pioneer and the glory of movie history—the birth of a popular art form given new life through a master's application of the coolest new techniques". James Cameron called Hugo "a masterpiece" and that the film "had the best use of 3D [he] had seen," surpassing even his own acclaimed films.

Top-ten lists
The film appeared on the following critics' lists of the top-ten films of 2011:

Accolades

References

External links

 
 
Hugo at the TCM Movie Database
 
 
 
 

2011 films
2011 3D films
2011 drama films
2010s adventure drama films
2010s American films
2010s English-language films
2010s mystery films
American 3D films
American adventure drama films
American children's adventure films
American children's drama films
American mystery films
American robot films
BAFTA winners (films)
Cultural depictions of Django Reinhardt
Cultural depictions of Georges Méliès
Cultural depictions of Salvador Dalí
Dieselpunk films
Films about bibliophilia
Films about filmmaking
Films about films
Films about magic and magicians
Films about orphans
Films about wish fulfillment
Films based on American novels
Films directed by Martin Scorsese
Films produced by Graham King
Films produced by Johnny Depp
Films produced by Martin Scorsese
Films scored by Howard Shore
Films set in 1931
Films set in France
Films set in Paris
Films shot at Longcross Studios
Films shot at Shepperton Studios
Films shot in London
Films shot in Paris
Films that won the Best Sound Editing Academy Award
Films that won the Best Sound Mixing Academy Award
Films that won the Best Visual Effects Academy Award
Films whose art director won the Best Art Direction Academy Award
Films whose cinematographer won the Best Cinematography Academy Award
Films whose director won the Best Director Golden Globe
Films with screenplays by John Logan
GK Films films
Infinitum Nihil films
Paramount Pictures films
Rail transport films